BQB - Líneas Aéreas (Spanish: BQB Airlines) was an airline based in Montevideo, Uruguay. Its main base was Carrasco International Airport. The airline was owned by the owner of Buquebus, Juan Carlos López Mena. The airline ceased operations in April 2015.

History

Routes that were approved: Montevideo, Uruguay (home base and hub) to Rosario, Córdoba, and Buenos Aires, Argentina, Asuncion, Paraguay, Porto Alegre and Florianópolis, Brazil. From Buenos Aires to Salto, Uruguay. Due to delays in government approvals and changes international routes were still pending when BQB ceased operations during April 2015, however BQB commenced ATR 72 domestic service from Montevideo to the cities of Salto twice a week (Mondays and Fridays) and the city of Rivera three times a week (Mondays-Wednesdays and Fridays) as a discount carrier and in competition with the bus service. These frequencies were expected to be increased. Other that were expected to commence included the routes from Montevideo to Rivera to Porto Alegre, Porto Alegre to Punta del Este and from Salto to Buenos Aires.

On April 11, 2015 the airline ceased operations due to a crisis that began in 2014, being sold 5 days later to the Bolivian Línea Aérea Amaszonas.

Destinations
As of April 2015 BQB Líneas Aéreas operated scheduled services to the following destinations:
 Argentina
 Buenos Aires – Aeroparque Jorge Newbery
 Paraguay
 Asuncion – Silvio Pettirossi International Airport
 Uruguay
 Montevideo – Carrasco/Gral. Cesáreo L. Berisso International Airport

Former Destinations:

 Argentina
 Buenos Aires – Ministro Pistarini International Airport
 Rosario – Islas Malvinas International Airport
 Brazil
 Curitiba – Afonso Pena International Airport
 Florianópolis – Hercílio Luz International Airport (Seasonal)
 Foz do Iguaçu - Foz do Iguaçu
 Porto Alegre – Salgado Filho International Airport
 Rio de Janeiro – Rio de Janeiro/Galeão-Antonio Carlos Jobim International Airport
 São Paulo – São Paulo/Guarulhos-Gov. André Franco Montoro International Airport
 Uruguay
 Rivera – Pres. Gral. Óscar D. Gestido International Airport
 Salto – Nueva Hesperides International Airport
 Punta del Este – Laguna del Sauce/Capitán de Corbeta Carlos A. Curbelo International Airport

Fleet

As of April 2015 BQB's fleet includes the following aircraft. In 2014 the company acquired Airbus A319, although it was never placed into service and was returned to its lessor in December 2014.

References

Further reading

External links
  

2010 establishments in Uruguay
2015 disestablishments in Uruguay
Airlines established in 2010
Airlines disestablished in 2015
Defunct airlines of Uruguay
Companies based in Montevideo
Uruguayan brands